Live at Sweetwater is a live Hot Tuna album recorded in 1992 at Mill Valley, CA.  It was their first new recording made for Relix Records, although they had previously released older performances with Relix (Splashdown, Historic Hot Tuna). Appearing on the album with Hot Tuna was Bob Weir of the Grateful Dead, blues-singer Maria Muldaur, and keyboardist Pete Sears who ended up staying with the band until 2000. In 2004 Eagle Records re-mastered and re-released the album with several added tracks, and some previous tracks shortened in length.

1992 Relix Records Track Listing
"Winin' Boy Blues" (Jelly Roll Morton) – 5:07
"Great Change" (Rev. Gary Davis) – 3:15
"Down and Out" (Cox) – 3:17
"Embryonic Journey" (Jorma Kaukonen) – 2:16
"Trouble in Mind" (Traditional) – 3:20
"Bank Robber" (Joe Strummer, Mick Jones, Michael Campbell) – 4:30
"I See the Light" (Kaukonen) – 6:38
"I'll Be There for You" (Michael Falzarano, Kaukonen) – 3:38
"I Belong to the Band" (Davis) – 3:42
"Maggie's Farm" (Bob Dylan) – 6:10
"Genesis" (Kaukonen) – 5:20
"Ice Age" (Kaukonen) – 6:18
"Pass the Snakes" (Kaukonen, Falzarano) – 7:56

2004 Eagle Records Track Listing
"Winin' Boy Blues" (Jelly Roll Morton) – 5:06
"Great Change" (Rev. Gary Davis) – 3:06
"Down and Out" (Cox) – 3:16
"I Know You Rider" (Traditional) – 4:41
"Embryonic Journey" (Jorma Kaukonen) – 2:18
"Trouble in Mind" (Traditional) – 3:15
"Bank Robber" (Strummer, Jones, Campbell) – 4:30
"I See the Light" (Kaukonen) – 6:37
"I'll Be There for You" (Michael Falzarano, Kaukonen) – 3:13
"True Religion" (Kaukonen) – 4:37
"I Belong to the Band" (Davis) – 3:38
"Maggie's Farm" (Bob Dylan) – 5:59
"That's Alright Mama" (Arthur Crudup) – 2:26
"Been So Long" (Kaukonen) – 3:46
"Genesis" (Kaukonen) – 4:41
"Ice Age" (Kaukonen) – 6:18
"Pass the Snakes" (Kaukonen, Falzarano) – 5:52

Personnel
Jorma Kaukonen – lead guitar, vocals, Dobro, table steel guitar
Jack Casady – bass
Michael Falzarano – rhythm guitar, vocals, mandolin, harmonica

Additional Personnel
Maria Muldaur – vocals, tambourine
Pete Sears – piano, accordion
Bob Weir – guitar, vocals

Production
Production team from Jorma's Hillside Farm Productions
Rick Sanchez – engineer
Ira Wilkes – king roadie and production coordination
Remote truck at Sweetwater from The Plant Recording Studios
Gabra Management – management
Steve Martin (William Morris Agency) – booking agent
Vanessa Lillian, Gabra Specialities – design layout
Jorma Kaukonen – liner notes
Carl Studna – cover photography
Barry Berenson – photography
Recorded live at Sweetwater, Mill Valley, CA on January 27 and 28, 1992

References

Hot Tuna live albums
1992 live albums
Relix Records live albums
Eagle Records live albums